Ho Jong-min (born 27 May 1988) is a North Korean footballer. He represented North Korea on at least four occasions in 2008.

Career statistics

International

References

1988 births
Living people
North Korean footballers
North Korea international footballers
Association football forwards